The 1996–97 Slovenian Ice Hockey League season was the sixth season of the Slovenian Hockey League. Olimpija have won the league championships.

First round

Group A

Group B

Final round

Play-offs

Final
Olimpija  (1) – Jesenice (2): 4–0 (2–1 n.V., 4–2, 8–2, 5–1)

3rd place
Bled (3) – Triglav Kranj (4): 2–0 (7–4, 8–7)

5th place

External links

1996–97 in Slovenian ice hockey
Slovenia
Slovenian Ice Hockey League seasons